Eco-running is the variation of recreational running in which the participant collects the litter that is found along the path travelled. The founder of Eco-Running is Samuel Huber of Milwaukee, Wisconsin in the United States.

See also
National Cleanup Day
 Plogging

References

Running by type
Environmental movements
Litter